Albinów may refer to the following places in Poland:
Albinów, Lower Silesian Voivodeship (south-west Poland)
Albinów, Łódź Voivodeship (central Poland)
Albinów, Siedlce County in Masovian Voivodeship (east-central Poland)
Albinów, Sokołów County in Masovian Voivodeship (east-central Poland)